The total medal count for all Asian Winter Games from 1986 Asian Winter Games in Sapporo, Japan to 2017 Asian Winter Games in Sapporo, Japan is tabulated below.

NOCs with medals

NOCs without medals

Ranked medal table

See also
 All-time Asian Games medal table (Summer Games)
 All-time Asian Para Games medal table

References

External links 
 OCA: Asian Games

Winter